Cinderella is a 1950 American animated musical fantasy film produced by Walt Disney Productions and released by RKO Radio Pictures. Based on Charles Perrault's 1697 fairy tale of the same title, it is the 12th Disney animated feature film. The film was directed by Wilfred Jackson, Hamilton Luske, and Clyde Geronimi. It features the voices of Ilene Woods, Eleanor Audley, Verna Felton, Rhoda Williams, James MacDonald, Luis van Rooten, and Don Barclay.

During the early 1940s, Walt Disney Productions had suffered financially after losing connections to the European film markets due to the outbreak of World War II. Because of this, the studio endured box office bombs such as Pinocchio (1940), Fantasia (1940), and Bambi (1942), all of which would later become more successful with several re-releases in theaters and on home video. By 1947, the studio was over $4 million in debt and was on the verge of bankruptcy. Walt Disney and his animators returned to feature film production in 1948 after producing a string of package films with the idea of adapting Charles Perrault's Cendrillon into an animated film.

Cinderella was released to theatres on February 15, 1950, receiving critical acclaim and becoming a box office success, which made it Disney's biggest hit since Snow White and the Seven Dwarfs (1937) and helped reverse the studio's fortunes. It also received three Academy Award nominations, including Best Scoring of a Musical Picture, Best Sound Recording, and Best Original Song for "Bibbidi-Bobbidi-Boo".

The film was followed by two direct-to-video sequels, Cinderella II: Dreams Come True (2002) and Cinderella III: A Twist in Time (2007), and a live-action adaptation in 2015. In 2018, the film was selected for preservation in the United States National Film Registry by the Library of Congress as being "culturally, historically, or aesthetically significant".

Plot

When Cinderella is a young girl, her widowed father marries Lady Tremaine, a widow with two daughters of her own. He dies shortly thereafter. Lady Tremaine, jealous of her stepdaughter's beauty and determined to forward her own daughters' interests, orders Cinderella to become a scullion in her own château, overburdening her with chores. Cinderella's stepsisters, Anastasia and Drizella, also take advantage of her meekness, mocking her and adding to her workload. Despite this, Cinderella remains kind of heart, obediently doing her chores whilst taking care of the mice and birds that live in the château, making friends of them, mainly of two mice named Jaq and Gus. She also protects them from being eaten by her stepmother's cat Lucifer, who makes her duties even harder in retaliation.

One day, the local King becomes impatient for his son to provide him with grandchildren. Despite the objections of the Grand Duke, the King invites all the eligible maidens in the kingdom to a royal ball, so that the Prince will choose one as his wife. Wanting to attend, Cinderella finds a dress of her late birth mother's to fix up. Her stepmother and stepsisters, afraid she will upstage them at the ball, deliberately keep her busy with no time to spare. Jaq, Gus, and the other animals decide to fix up the dress for Cinderella, using beads and a sash discarded by the stepsisters. However, when Cinderella attempts to go to the ball with her family, her stepsisters recognize their belongings and angrily tear the dress into rags, before leaving Cinderella behind.

A distraught Cinderella runs out to the garden in tears, kneeling on a stone bench. There, she is met by her Fairy Godmother, who has come to help. She transforms Jaq, Gus, and two other mice into four white horses, a pumpkin into a coach, and Cinderella's old horse Major and bloodhound Bruno into a coachman and footman, respectively. The fairy godmother also gives Cinderella a shimmering ball gown and glass slippers, but warns her that the magic will all end on the stroke of midnight.

Cinderella arrives at the ball, and is not recognized by her stepsisters, though her stepmother believes something is familiar about her. The Prince is instantly smitten, so the King orders the Grand Duke to make sure the romance goes without a hitch. The Duke prevents anyone from interfering as Cinderella and the Prince dance a waltz and wander out to the palace grounds, falling deeper in love. However, when Cinderella hears the clock tolling midnight, she runs away before she and the Prince can exchange names. Despite the efforts of the Grand Duke, Cinderella flees the palace, losing one of her slippers on the staircase. The palace guards pursue, but when the magic ends on the stroke of 12, Cinderella and the animals revert to their former appearances and hide in the woods. Cinderella discovers the other glass slipper is still on her foot, and takes it home with her.

The Prince promises he will marry none but the girl who fits the glass slipper. Elated, the King orders the Grand Duke to try the shoe on every girl in the kingdom until he finds a match. When the news reaches the chateau, Cinderella is shocked to realize it was the Prince she met. Hearing Cinderella humming the waltz from the ball, Lady Tremaine realizes the truth and locks Cinderella in her attic bedroom. While the stepsisters unsuccessfully try on the slipper, Jaq and Gus steal the key back from Lady Tremaine. As they take the key to Cinderella, Lucifer attempts to stop them by trapping Gus and battling the other mice. The birds summon Bruno, who scares Lucifer out of the house, and a freed Cinderella hurries to meet the Grand Duke.

In a last effort to prevent Cinderella from overshadowing her daughters, Lady Tremaine causes a page to trip and break the glass slipper. Cinderella reveals she has the other slipper, which the Grand Duke places on her foot, much to Lady Tremaine's shock. Cinderella and the Prince are married, and share a kiss as they set off in a carriage for their honeymoon.

Cast 

 Ilene Woods as Cinderella, a humble and hard-working young woman who is forced to become a maidservant due to abuse by her stepmother and stepsisters. Around 380 applicants auditioned for the role until it was announced in March 1948 that Woods had been cast.
 Eleanor Audley as Lady Tremaine, Cinderella's cruel and abusive stepmother, who despises her stepdaughter for being more charming and beautiful than her own daughters. 
 Verna Felton as the Fairy Godmother, a kind-hearted and slightly absent-minded sorceress who helps Cinderella get to the ball and meet the Prince.
 Rhoda Williams as Drizella Tremaine, Lady Tremaine's elder daughter and Cinderella's stepsister.
 Lucille Bliss as Anastasia Tremaine, Lady Tremaine's younger daughter and Cinderella's stepsister.
 Jimmy MacDonald as Jaq, Gus and Bruno, Cinderella's animal friends.
 Luis van Rooten as The King, the Prince's short-tempered father who wants his son to get married and have children. Van Rooten also provides the voice of the Grand Duke, the King's fussy majordomo and confidant.
 William Edward Phipps as Prince Charming, the King's son, who falls in love with Cinderella. Mike Douglas provided the character's singing voice. 
 June Foray as Lucifer, Lady Tremaine's mean-spirited cat who attempts to hunt down Jaq and Gus.
 Betty Lou Gerson as the Narrator.

Animators 
 Marc Davis, Eric Larson, and Les Clark were the supervising animators of Cinderella.
 Frank Thomas was the supervising animator of Lady Tremaine.
 Milt Kahl was the supervising animator of Fairy Godmother.
 Ollie Johnston was the supervising animator of Drizella Tremaine and Anastasia Tremaine.
 Ward Kimball, Wolfgang Reitherman, and John Lounsbery were the supervising animators of Jaq and Gus.
 Ward Kimball, John Lounsbery, and Norm Ferguson were the supervising animators of Bruno and Lucifer.
 Milt Kahl and Norman Ferguson were the supervising animators of The King.
 Frank Thomas, Milt Kahl, and Norman Ferguson were the supervising animators of The Grand Duke.

Production

Story development
In 1922, Walt Disney produced a Laugh-O-Gram cartoon based on "Cinderella", and he had been interested in producing a second version in December 1933 as a Silly Symphony short. Burt Gillett was attached as the director while Frank Churchill was assigned as the composer. A story outline included "white mice and birds" as Cinderella's playmates. To expand the story, storyboard artists suggested visual gags, some of which ended up in the final film. However, by early 1938, the story proved to be too complicated to be condensed into a short so it was suggested as a potential animated feature film, starting with a fourteen-page outline written by Al Perkins. Two years later, a second treatment was written by Dana Cofy and Bianca Majolie, in which Cinderella's stepmother was named Florimel de la Pochel; her stepsisters as Wanda and Javotte; her pet mouse Dusty and pet turtle Clarissa; the stepsisters' cat Bon Bob; the Prince's aide Spink, and the stepsisters' dancing instructor Monsieur Carnewal. This version stuck closely to the original fairy tale until Cinderella arrives home late from the second ball. Her stepfamily then imprisons Cinderella in a dungeon cellar. When Spink and his troops arrive at the la Pochel residence, Dusty takes the slipper and leads them to free Cinderella.

By September 1943, Disney had assigned Dick Huemer and Joe Grant to begin work on Cinderella as story supervisors and given a preliminary budget of $1 million. However, by 1945, their preliminary story work was halted. During the writing stages of Song of the South (1946), Dalton S. Reymond and Maurice Rapf quarreled, and Rapf was reassigned to work on Cinderella. In his version, Cinderella was written to be a less passive character than Snow White, and more rebellious against her stepfamily. Rapf explained, "My thinking was you can't have somebody who comes in and changes everything for you. You can't be delivered on a platter. You've got to earn it. So in my version, the Fairy Godmother said, 'It's okay till midnight but from then on it's up to you.' I made her earn it, and what she had to do to achieve it was to rebel against her stepmother and stepsisters, to stop being a slave in her own home. So I had a scene where they're ordering her around and she throws the stuff back at them. She revolts, so they lock her up in the attic. I don't think anyone took (my idea) very seriously."

In spring 1946, Disney held three story meetings, and subsequently received treatment from Ted Sears, Homer Brightman, and Harry Reeves dated March 24, 1947. In the treatment, the Prince was introduced earlier in the story reminiscent of Snow White and the Seven Dwarfs (1937), and there was a hint of the cat-and-mouse conflict. By May 1947, the first rough phase of storyboarding was in the process, and an inventory report that same month suggested a different approach with the story "largely through the animals in the barnyard and their observations of Cinderella's day-to-day activities".

Following the theatrical release of Fun and Fancy Free (1947), Walt Disney Productions' bank debt declined from $4.2 million to $3 million. Around this time, Disney acknowledged the need for sound economic policies but emphasized to the loaners that slashing production would be suicidal. To restore the studio to full financial health, he expressed his desire to return to producing full-length animated films. By then, three animated projects—Cinderella, Alice in Wonderland (1951), and Peter Pan (1953)—were in development. Disney felt the characters in Alice in Wonderland and Peter Pan were too cold, while Cinderella contained elements similar to Snow White, and greenlit the project. Selecting his top-tier animation talent, Ben Sharpsteen was assigned as supervising producer while Hamilton Luske, Wilfred Jackson, and Clyde Geronimi became the sequence directors. Nevertheless, production on Alice resumed so that both animation crews would effectively compete against each other to see which film would finish first.

By early 1948, Cinderella had progressed further than Alice in Wonderland, and was fast-tracked to become the first full-length animated film since Bambi (1942). During a story meeting on January 15, 1948, the cat-and-mouse sequences began to grow into an important element in the film so much that Disney placed veteran story artist Bill Peet in charge of the cat-and-mouse segments.

By the late 1940s, Disney's involvement during production had shrunken noticeably. As he was occupied with trains and the filming of Treasure Island (1950), the directors were left to exercise their own judgment more on details. Although Disney no longer held daily story meetings, the three directors still communicated with him by mailing him memoranda, scripts, Photostats of storyboards, and acetates of soundtrack recordings while he was in England for two and a half months during the summer of 1949. When Disney did not respond, work resumed and then had to be undone when he did. In one instance, when Disney returned to the studio on August 29, he reviewed Luske's animation sequences and ordered numerous minor changes, as well as a significant reworking of the film's climax. Production was finished by October 13, 1949.

Casting
Mack David and Jerry Livingston had asked Ilene Woods to sing on several demo recordings of the songs. They had previously known her from her eponymous radio show, which was broadcast on ABC. The show featured fifteen minutes of music, in which David and Livingston had their music presented. Two days later, Woods received a telephone call from Disney, with whom she immediately scheduled an interview. Woods recalled in an interview with the Los Angeles Times, "We met and talked for a while, and he said, 'How would you like to be Cinderella?'," to which she agreed.

For the role of Lucifer, a studio representative asked June Foray if she could provide the voice of a cat. "Well, I could do anything," recalled Foray, "So he hired me as Lucifer the cat in Cinderella".

Animation

Live-action reference
Starting in spring 1948, actors were filmed on large soundstages mouthing to a playback of the dialogue soundtrack. Disney had previously used live-action reference on Snow White and the Seven Dwarfs (1937), Pinocchio (1940), and Fantasia (1940), but as part of an effort to keep the production cost down, the footage was used to check the plot, timing, and movement of the characters before animating it. The footage was then edited frame-by-frame onto large Photostat sheets to duplicate, in which the animators found too restrictive as they were not allowed to imagine anything that the live actors did not present since that kind of experimentation might necessitate changes and cost more money. Additionally, the animators were instructed to draw from a certain directorial perspective to avoid difficult shots and angles. Frank Thomas explained, "Anytime you'd think of another way of staging the scene, they'd say: 'We can't get the camera up there'! Well, you could get the animation camera up there! So you had to go with what worked well in live-action."

Walt Disney hired actress Helene Stanley to perform the live-action reference for Cinderella, allowing artists to draw animated frames based on the movements of the actress. She later did the same kind of work for the characters of Princess Aurora in Sleeping Beauty (1959) and Anita Radcliffe in One Hundred and One Dalmatians (1961). Animators modeled Prince Charming on actor Jeffrey Stone, who also provided some additional voices for the film. Claire Du Brey served as the live-action reference for the Fairy Godmother, although the design for the character was based on Mary Alice O'Connor (the wife of layout artist Ken O'Connor).

Character animation
By 1950, the animation board, which had been established as early as 1940 to help with the management of the animation department, had settled down to nine supervising animators, including Frank Thomas, Ollie Johnston, Les Clark, Wolfgang Reitherman, Eric Larson, Ward Kimball, Milt Kahl, John Lounsbery, and Marc Davis. Although they were still in their thirties, they were jokingly referred by Disney as the "Nine Old Men" after President Franklin D. Roosevelt's denigration of the Supreme Court.

Eric Larson and Marc Davis were both tasked with designing and animating Cinderella. Larson was the first to animate the character whom he envisioned as a "sixteen-year-old with braids and a pug nose", but Disney grew displeased with this approach and assigned Davis as the second supervising animator, whose designs suggested a "more the exotic dame" with a long swan-like neck. To minimize the differences and set the final design, Disney assigned one of the staff animators and clean up artist Ken O'Brien, who, as Larson said, made "his gals and Marc's gals look like the same gal." Due to the extensive use of the live-action reference for the film, Helene Stanley's physical features also influenced the character's final appearance.

Frank Thomas was assigned as the supervising animator of Lady Tremaine, which he was "astounded" with, since he had previously mainly specialized in more "charming" characters, like Pinocchio or Bambi.

Milt Kahl was the directing animator of the Fairy Godmother, the King, and the Grand Duke. Originally, Disney intended for the Fairy Godmother to be a tall, regal character as he viewed fairies as tall, motherly figures (as seen in the Blue Fairy in Pinocchio (1940)), but Milt Kahl disagreed with this characterization. Following the casting of Verna Felton, Kahl managed to convince Disney of his undignified concept of the Fairy Godmother.

Unlike the human characters, the animal characters were animated without live-action reference. During production, none of Kimball's designs for Lucifer had pleased Disney. After visiting Kimball's steam train at his home, Disney saw his calico cat and remarked, "Hey—there's your model for Lucifer". Reitherman animated the sequence in which Jaq and Gus laboriously drag the key up the flight of stairs to Cinderella.

Music

In 1946, story artist and part-time lyricist Larry Morey joined studio music director Charles Walcott to compose the songs. Cinderella would sing three songs: "Sing a Little, Dream a Little" while overloaded with work, "The Mouse Song" as she dressed the mice, and "The Dress My Mother Wore" as she fantasizes about her mother's old wedding dress. To recycle an unused fantasy sequence from Snow White, the song, "Dancing on a Cloud" was used as Cinderella and the Prince waltz during the ball. After the ball, she would sing "I Lost My Heart at the Ball" and the Prince would sing "The Face That I See in the Night." However, none of their songs were used.

Two years later, Disney turned to Tin Pan Alley songwriters Mack David, Jerry Livingston, and Al Hoffman to compose the songs. They were the first professional composers to be hired outside the production company. The trio had previously written the song "Chi-Baba, Chi-Baba" that Disney heard on the radio and decided would work well with the Fairy Godmother sequence. They finished the songs in March 1949. In total six songs were performed in the film: "Cinderella", "A Dream Is a Wish Your Heart Makes", "Oh, Sing Sweet Nightingale", "The Work Song", "Bibbidi-Bobbidi-Boo", and "So This is Love".

Oliver Wallace and Paul Smith composed the score, but only after the animation was ready for inking, which was incidentally similar to scoring a live-action film. This was a drastic change from the earlier Disney animated features in which the music and action were carefully synchronized in a process known as Mickey Mousing.

The film also marked the launching of the Walt Disney Music Company. The soundtrack was also a first in using multi-tracks for vocals – with the song "Oh, Sing Sweet Nightingale", Ilene Woods recorded a second and third vocal track to enable her to sing harmony with herself.

On February 4, 1950, Billboard announced that RCA Records and Disney would release a children's album in conjunction with the theatrical release. The RCA Victor album release sold about 750,000 copies during its first release, and hit number-one on the Billboard pop charts.

In 1995, a special edition of the soundtrack was released to coincide with the film's re-release on home video entitled Walt Disney Records Presents The Music of Cinderella. The album opened with cover versions of the songs from the film including Linda Ronstadt singing "A Dream is a Wish Your Heart Makes" in English and Spanish, Take 6 singing "The Work Song", James Ingram singing "So This is Love", David Benoit and David Sanborn performing a jazz medley from the film, and Bobby McFerrin's take on "Bibbidi-Bobbidi-Boo".

The soundtrack for Cinderella was released by Walt Disney Records on CD and audio cassette on February 4, 1997, and included a bonus demo. On October 4, 2005, Disney released a special edition of the soundtrack album of Cinderella, for the Platinum Edition DVD release, which includes several demo songs cut from the final film, a new song, and a cover version of "A Dream is a Wish Your Heart Makes". The soundtrack was released again on October 2, 2012, and consisted of several lost chords and new recordings of them. A Walmart exclusive limited edition "Music Box Set" consisting of the soundtrack without the lost chords or bonus demos, the Song and Story: Cinderella CD and a bonus DVD of Tangled Ever After was released on the same day.

In conjunction with the film's 65th anniversary, the soundtrack for Cinderella was re-released in 2015 as part of the Legacy Collection.

Songs
Original songs performed in the film include:

Release
The film was originally released in theaters on February 15, 1950, in Boston, Massachusetts. Cinderella was re-released in 1957, 1965, 1973, 1981 and 1987. Cinderella also played a limited engagement in select Cinemark Theatres from February 16–18, 2013.

Critical reaction
The film became a critical success garnering the best reception for a Disney animated film since Dumbo. In a personal letter to Walt Disney, director Michael Curtiz hailed the film as the "masterpiece of all pictures you have done." Producer Hal Wallis declared, "If this is not your best, it is very close to the top." Mae Tinee, reviewing for the Chicago Tribune, remarked: "The film not only is handsome, with imaginative art and glowing colors to bedeck the old fairy tale, but it also is told gently, without the lurid villains which sometimes give little tots nightmares. It is enhanced by the sudden, piquant touches of humor and the music which appeal to old and young." Time magazine wrote that "Cinderella is beguiling proof that Walt Disney knows his way around fairyland. Harking back to the style of Snow White and the Seven Dwarfs (1937), a small army of Disney craftsmen have given the centuries-old Cinderella story a dewy radiance of comic verve that should make children feel like elves and adults feel like children."

However, the characterization of Cinderella received a mixed reception. Bosley Crowther of The New York Times wrote, "The beautiful Cinderella has a voluptuous face and form—not to mention an eager disposition—to compare with Al Capp's Daisy Mae." However, criticizing her role and personality, Crowther opined, "As a consequence, the situation in which they are mutually involved have the constraint and immobility of panel-expressed episodes. When Mr. Disney tries to make them behave like human beings, they're banal." Similarly, Variety claimed the film found "more success in projecting the lower animals than in its central character, Cinderella, who is on the colorless, doll-faced side, as is the Prince Charming."

Contemporary reviews have remained positive. Roger Ebert of the Chicago Sun-Times awarded the film three out of four stars during its 1987 re-release. Jonathan Rosenbaum of the Chicago Reader wrote the film "shows Disney at the tail end of his best period, when his backgrounds were still luminous with depth and detail and his incidental characters still had range and bite." The website's critical consensus reads, "The rich colors, sweet songs, adorable mice and endearing (if suffering) heroine make Cinderella a nostalgically lovely charmer."

Box office
The film was Disney's greatest box office success since Snow White and the Seven Dwarfs, earning nearly $4.28 million in distributor rentals (the distributor's share of the box office gross) from the United States and Canada. It was the fifth highest-grossing film released in North America in 1950. It was the fifth most popular movie at the British box office in 1951. The film is France's sixteenth biggest film of all time in terms of admissions with 13.2 million tickets sold.

The success of Cinderella allowed Disney to carry on producing films throughout the 1950s by which the profits from the film's release, with the additional profits from record sales, music publishing, publications, and other merchandise gave Disney the cash flow to finance a slate of productions (animated and live-action), establish his own distribution company, enter television production, and begin building Disneyland during the decade, as well as developing the Florida Project, later known as Walt Disney World.

Cinderella has had a lifetime domestic gross of $93 million, and a lifetime worldwide gross of $182 million across its original release and several reissues. Adjusted for inflation, and incorporating subsequent releases, the film has had a lifetime gross of $565 million.

Accolades

In June 2008, the American Film Institute revealed its "10 Top 10"— the best ten films in ten "classic" American film genres—after polling over 1,500 people from the creative community. Cinderella was acknowledged as the 9th greatest film in the animation genre.

American Film Institute recognition:
 AFI's 100 Years...100 Movies – Nominated
 AFI's 100 Years...100 Passions – Nominated
 AFI's 100 Years...100 Heroes and Villains:
 Lady Tremaine (Stepmother) – Nominated Villain
 AFI's 100 Years...100 Songs:
 Bibbidi-Bobbidi-Boo – Nominated
 A Dream Is A Wish Your Heart Makes – Nominated
 AFI's Greatest Movie Musicals – Nominated
 AFI's 100 Years...100 Movies (10th Anniversary Edition) – Nominated
 AFI's 10 Top 10 – #9 Animated film

Home media
Cinderella was released on VHS and LaserDisc on October 4, 1988, as part of the Walt Disney Classics collection. The release had a promotion with a free lithograph reproduction for those who pre-ordered the video before its release date. Disney had initially shipped 4.3 million VHS copies to retailers, but due to strong consumer demand, more than seven million copies were shipped. At the time of its initial home video release, it was the best-selling VHS title until it was overtaken by E.T. the Extra-Terrestrial (1982). The VHS release was placed into moratorium on April 30, 1989, with  copies sold and having grossed  in sales revenue.

On October 4, 1995, a digitally remastered edition of film was released on VHS and LaserDisc as part of the "Walt Disney Masterpiece Collection", and later in the UK on November 24, 1997. Both editions were accompanied by "The Making of Cinderella" featurette. A Deluxe LaserDisc included the featurette, an illustrated, hardcover book retelling the story with pencil tests and conceptual art from the film, and a reprint of the film's artwork. Disney shipped more than 15 million VHS copies, of which 8 million were sold in the first month.

On October 4, 2005, Disney released the film on DVD with a digitally remastered transfer. This release was the sixth installment of the Walt Disney Platinum Editions series. According to Home Media Magazine, Disney sold 3.2 million copies in its first week, which earned over $64 million in sales. The Platinum Edition was also released on VHS, but the only special feature was the "A Dream Is a Wish Your Heart Makes" music video by the Disney Channel Circle of Stars. The Platinum Edition DVD, along with the sequels to the film, went into the Disney Vault on January 31, 2008. In the United Kingdom and Ireland, a "Royal Edition" of Cinderella was released on DVD on April 4, 2011, to commemorate the UK Royal Wedding of Prince William and Catherine Middleton. This release had a unique limited edition number on every slipcase and an exclusive art card.

On October 2, 2012, a 3-disc Blu-ray/DVD/Digital Copy Combo Diamond Edition was released. The Diamond Edition release also included a 2-disc Blu-ray/DVD combo and a 6-disc "Jewelry Box Set" that included the first film alongside both its sequels. A 1-disc DVD edition was released on November 20, 2012. The Diamond Edition release went back into the Disney Vault on January 31, 2017.

Cinderella was re-released on HD digital download on June 18, 2019, with a physical media re-release on Blu-ray on June 25, 2019, as part of the Walt Disney Signature Collection commemorating the film's 70th anniversary.

Sequels and other media
 A direct-to-video sequel Cinderella II: Dreams Come True was released in 2002.
 A second direct-to-video sequel Cinderella III: A Twist in Time in 2007.
 Cinderella and the Fairy Godmother have appeared as guests in Disney's House of Mouse.
 Cinderella and the Fairy Godmother appear in the video game Kingdom Hearts and a world based on the film, Castle of Dreams, appears in Kingdom Hearts Birth by Sleep. All the main characters except Gus, Bruno, and the King appear.
 A scaled-down stage musical version of the film known as Disney's Cinderella KIDS is frequently performed by schools and children's theaters.
 A live-action adaptation of the film produced by Walt Disney Pictures, directed by Kenneth Branagh was released in 2015; starring Lily James, Richard Madden, Cate Blanchett, and Helena Bonham Carter.
 Cinderella and the other Disney Princesses all appeared as guest appearances in the 2018 film Ralph Breaks the Internet.
 The film was featured in the 2021 biographical drama film King Richard.

Cultural impact and legacy

Smithsonian magazine discussed how Cinderella endures and resonates, saying: "Dozens of other filmmakers have borrowed elements of the tale, starting as early as 1899 with a French version directed by the pioneering filmmaker Georges Méliès." Time magazine also discussed the films popularity saying: "References to Cinderella proliferated in popular culture and were widely used to sell consumer goods. Shell Petroleum used an image of a fashionably dressed Cinderella exiting her pumpkin coach in an advertisement of the 1940s, Revlon lipstick boasted a new lipstick in a "Cinderella pumpkin" shade of orange, and Coty packaged perfume in a faux glass slipper."

Cinderella is referred by many as one of the most recognizable tales in history. Parade magazine listed the film among the Greatest Animated films of all time. American Film Institute ranked Cinderella as the 9th Best Animated Films of all time, saying: "one of the most recognizable fairytale stories ever, Cinderella has stood the test of time." Reader's Digest also listed the film as one of the most popular fairy tales of all time.

See also

Lists of animated feature films
List of Disney animated films based on fairy tales
List of Disney theatrical animated feature films

References

Bibliography

External links

 
 
 
 
 
 

Cinderella (franchise)
1950 animated films
1950 films
1950s American animated films
1950s children's fantasy films
1950s romantic fantasy films
1950s romantic musical films
1950s English-language films
American children's animated fantasy films
American children's animated musical films
American romantic fantasy films
American romantic musical films
American animated feature films
Animated films about mice
Animated romance films
Disney Princess films
Films about abuse
Films about fairies and sprites
Films about princesses
Films about royalty
Films about weddings
Films about wish fulfillment
Films based on Charles Perrault's Cinderella
Films directed by Clyde Geronimi
Films directed by Hamilton Luske
Films directed by Wilfred Jackson
Films produced by Walt Disney
Films scored by Oliver Wallace
Films scored by Paul Smith (film and television composer)
Films set in country houses
Films set in palaces
Films set in France
Films set in the 1850s
Golden Bear winners
Rotoscoped films
United States National Film Registry films
Walt Disney Animation Studios films
Walt Disney Pictures animated films
Films with screenplays by Winston Hibler